Colonel Sir John Wakefield Weston, 1st Baronet (13 June 1852 – 19 September 1926) was a British soldier and Conservative Party politician.

Weston sat as the Member of Parliament (MP) for Kendal between 1913 and 1918,. When the constituency was abolished, he sat as the member for Westmorland between 1918 and 1924. In July 1926 he was created a baronet, of Kendal in the County of Westmorland.

Weston died in September 1926, aged 71, when the baronetcy became extinct.

References

External links 
 

1852 births
1926 deaths
UK MPs 1910–1918
UK MPs 1918–1922
UK MPs 1922–1923
UK MPs 1923–1924
Conservative Party (UK) MPs for English constituencies
Baronets in the Baronetage of the United Kingdom